Robert Thorp may refer to:

 Robert Thorp (MP) (1900–1966), Conservative party MP in England
 Robert Taylor Thorp (1850–1938), US Congressman
 Robert Thorp (priest) (1736–1812), Archdeacon of Northumberland
 Robert Thorp (judge) (died 1291), Justice of the Common Pleas
 Robert Thorp (Indian Army officer) (1838–1868), author of Kashmir Misgovernment

See also
 Robert Thorpe (disambiguation)